Wu Shuangzhan is a retired Chinese general who served as commander of the People's Armed Police from 1999 to 2009. On June 20, 2004, he was awarded the military rank of general (shang jiang). He was a member of the 16th and 17th Central Committees of the Chinese Communist Party.

Career
Wu Shuangzhan was born in 1945 in Qingfeng County, Henan province. He joined the People's Liberation Army in 1963. He became major general in 1990, but was then transferred to the People's Armed Police in 1993. In the PAP, he became lieutenant general in 1997 and general in 2004.

References

People's Liberation Army generals from Henan
Living people
People from Puyang
1945 births
Members of the 16th Central Committee of the Chinese Communist Party
Members of the 17th Central Committee of the Chinese Communist Party
Commanders of the People's Armed Police